Zakaria III Mkhargrdzeli (died 1261 AD) was a 13th century Georgian noble of Armenian descent and amirspasalar of Georgia. He was married to daughter of Sargis I Jaqeli, duke of Samtskhe.

Biography 
King David VII Ulu made Zakaria, son of Shanshe an escort for his journey to Karakorum, where Zakaria attended on an official recognition of David by Güyük Khan. In 1258, Zakaria participated in the Siege of Baghdad organized by Hulagu Khan. In 1260, Hulagu Khan requested from David VII Ulu to support him in the war against Mamluk Sultanate in Cairo. David, remembering the Georgian losses at Baghdad refused to comply and revolted against his Mongol overlord. It happened that Zakare was with Mongol general Arghun Aqa. However he went unbeknownst to Arghun to see his wife who was with her father Sargis I Jaqeli, one of the rebels. When Arghun learned about this, he notified Hulagu, who himself ordered that Zakare be taken shackled. Zakaria was executed, while his father Shanshe was freed for a ransom.

Source
Shoshiashvili, N., Georgian Soviet Encyclopedia, vol. 7, p. 271. Tbilisi, 1979

References 

1261 deaths
House of Mkhargrdzeli
Nobility of Georgia (country)
Military personnel from Georgia (country)
13th-century people from Georgia (country)
Year of birth unknown
People executed by the Mongol Empire
Georgian people of Armenian descent